The Ostern (Eastern; , Istern; or остерн) or Red Western was a film genre created in the Soviet Union and Eastern Bloc as a variation of the Western films that originated in the United States. The word "Ostern" is a portmanteau derived from the German word Ost, meaning "East", and the English word "western". The term now includes two related genres:

 Proper Red Westerns, set in America's "Wild West" but involving radically different themes and interpretations than US westerns. Examples include Lemonade Joe (Czechoslovakia, 1964), or The Sons of Great Bear (East Germany, 1966) or The Oil, the Baby and the Transylvanians (Romania, 1981), or A Man from the Boulevard des Capucines (USSR, 1987). These were mostly produced in Eastern European countries like East Germany and Czechoslovakia, rather than USSR.
 Easterns (Osterns), set usually on the steppes or Asian parts of the USSR, especially during the Russian Revolution or the following Civil War, but presented in a style inspired by American western films. Examples of these include The Elusive Avengers (1966) and its two sequels, White Sun of the Desert (1970), Dauria (1971), At Home among Strangers (1974), The Burning Miles (1957), The Bodyguard (1979), and The Sixth (1981). Outside of the USSR, there was Polish Wolves' Echoes (1968), set in Bieszczady Mountains.

While influenced by Westerns, Easterns form a specific and distinct genre.

Red Westerns of the first type are often compared to Spaghetti Westerns, in that they use local scenery to imitate the American West. In particular, Yugoslavia, Mongolia and the Southern USSR were used. Some of the East German films were called Sauerkraut Westerns.

"Eastern" films typically replaced the Wild West setting with by an Eastern setting in the steppes of the Caucasus or deserts of Central  Asia. Western stock characters such as "cowboys and Indians" were also replaced by Caucasian or Asian stock characters, such as bandits and harems. A famous example of the genre was White Sun of the Desert, which was popular in the Soviet Union.

Red Westerns in an international context

Red Westerns which use the actual American west as a setting include, the Romanian The Oil, the Baby and the Transylvanians (1981) which dramatises the struggles of Romanian and Hungarian settlers in a new land. The Czech Lemonade Joe and the Soviet A Man from the Boulevard des Capucines plump for pastiche or satire, making fun of the hard worn conventions of the American films. The German The Sons of the Great Bear (1966) turned the traditional American "Cowboy and Indian" conventions on their head, casting the Native Americans as the heroes and the American Army as the villains - this was well within the established tradition of Karl May's highly successful German Western novels (such as the Winnetou series), but had some obvious Cold War overtones. The film started a series of "Indian films" by the East German DEFA studios which were quite successful.

Many of the non-Soviet examples of the genre were international co-productions akin to the Spaghetti Westerns. The Sons of the Great Bear for example was a co-production between East Germany and Czechoslovakia, starring a Yugoslav, scripted in German, and shot in a number of different Eastern Bloc countries and used a variety of locations including Yugoslavia, Bulgaria, Mongolia and Czechoslovakia. The Oil, the Baby and the Transylvanians is a Romanian film, which features emigrant Romanians heavily in the storyline.

Gibanica westerns
"Gibanica western" was a short-lived term for the Yugoslav equivalent of the Ostern, more commonly known as partisan film and, sometimes, the Partisan western. They were made in the 1960s, 1970s and 1980s, and were about the partisans in World War II. The term "Gibanica" refers to a traditional Balkan pastry dish.

Goulash westerns
The Goulash westerns are the Easterns of Hungarian director György Szomjas. He directed two films (The Wind Blows Under Your Feet and Wrong-Doers) in the 1970s.

See also
 DEFA (film studio)
 Native American hobbyism in Germany, a hobby consisting of Germans impersonating American Indian culture.
 Vsevolod Ivanov, Soviet writer who was a formative influence on the Ostern.

References

 
Film genres
Western (genre) films by genre
Cinema of the Soviet Union
Eastern Bloc mass media
Western (genre) subgenres